The Godoberi are one of the Andi-Dido peoples of Dagestan.  They numbered 1,425 in 1926 and about 4,500 in 2007. They live mainly in the three villages of Godoberi (abt 2500), Ziberkhali (abt 60) and Beledi (abt 10) in the Botlikhsky District.  About 1800 Godoberis live on the plains of Dagestan in Terechnoye (close to the city of Khasavyurt).

Most Godoberi are followers of Sunni Islam. They had their own feudal free community that had a loose relationship with the Avar Khanate prior to the annexation of the area to Russia in 1806.  

During the transition from Czarist to Communist rule many Godoberi became involved in nationalistic and pan-Islamic movements.  Among these were Firkatul-Vedzhan.  Large numbers of the supporters of such movements were killed by Soviet authorities around 1930.

References

Sources
Kolga et al., The Red Book of the Peoples of the Russian Empire, p. 129-132.

Ethnic groups in Dagestan
Muslim communities of Russia
Peoples of the Caucasus
Muslim communities of the Caucasus